Blanch fee, or blanch holding (from French blanc, white), an ancient tenure in Scots land law, the duty payable being in silver or "white" money in contradistinction to gold. The phrase was afterwards applied to any holding of which the quit-rent was merely nominal, such as a penny, a peppercorn, etc.

See also
 Peppercorn rent

References

Agriculture in Scotland
Currencies of Scotland
Scots law legal terminology
Land law
Taxation in Scotland
Scots property law